Phyzelaphryne, commonly known as Miriam's frogs, is a genus of frogs in the family Eleutherodactylidae. The species in this genus are endemic to Brazil.
Considered as monotypic until 2018, there are two species currently recognised:

 Phyzelaphryne  miriamae Heyer, 1977
 Phyzelaphryne nimio Simões, Costa, Rojas-Runjaic, Gagliardi-Urrutia, Sturaro, Peloso, and Castroviejo-Fisher, 2018

References

Eleutherodactylidae
Amphibians of Brazil
Endemic fauna of Brazil
Amphibian genera